Scott Maginness (born 2 August 1966) is a former Australian rules footballer who played with Hawthorn in the VFL/AFL.

A half back flanker, Maginness played in the strong Hawthorn sides of the 1980s and early 1990s. He made his debut in 1988 and was a premiership player in his first two seasons. He started on Gary Ablett in the 1989 VFL Grand Final, who kicked four goals in the first quarter and a half, before the bigger and stronger Chris Langford was moved onto Ablett. Despite Ablett's dominance, kicking nine goals and winning the Norm Smith Medal as the best player, Maginness still ended up on the winning side.

He is the son of former Hawthorn player, Norm Maginness.  He currently works as a chiropractor.

In 2019 his son, Finn Maginness was drafted by Hawthorn as a Father-son draftee.

References

External links

Hawksheadquarters profile

1966 births
Living people
Hawthorn Football Club players
Hawthorn Football Club Premiership players
Old Scotch Football Club players
Australian rules footballers from Victoria (Australia)
People educated at Scotch College, Melbourne
Victorian State of Origin players
Two-time VFL/AFL Premiership players